The 1852 United States presidential election in Iowa took place on November 2, 1852, as part of the 1852 United States presidential election. Voters chose four representatives, or electors to the Electoral College, who voted for President and Vice President.

Iowa voted for the Democratic candidate, Franklin Pierce, over Whig candidate Winfield Scott. Pierce won Iowa by a margin of 5.39%.

This would be the last time Iowa would back a Democratic presidential nominee until 1912, and the last time it would be with an absolute majority of the vote until 1932.

Results

See also
 United States presidential elections in Iowa

References

Iowa
1852
1852 Iowa elections